Colour Club is an American smooth jazz group that was founded in the 1990s by Skipper Wise and Les Pierce. A record producer, Pierce worked with Take 6, Herb Alpert, and Patti LaBelle. Wise led the group Windows during the 1980s and '90s but left the music business in the late 1990s to lead the technology company Blue Microphones. Wise and Pierce formed Colour Club in the early 1990s as a combination of smooth jazz and hip hop. They set aside  individual projects, and for their second and third albums they hired vocalist Lisa Taylor with guest musicians such as Gary Meek and Rick Braun. Their self-titled debut in 1994 included the single "Freedom Words". The video was nominated for an American Music Award.

History
In 1994, Skipper was introduced to Les Pierce who had a Top 40 hit at the time with the pop group “Louie Louie” and was producing the vocal group, “Take Six”. Skipper was signed to JVC Records for a three album deal along with Les Pierce as the group “Colour Club”

Colour Club, the self-titled album was released on the JVC  label in early 1994 and reached number 5 on the NAC radio charts. The album was branded as the new movement in Europe called “Acid Jazz”

The video for the single “Freedom Words” was shot in  Zuma Beach, Malibu in Southern Calif and produced by Mitchel Linden. The results yielded a video of the year nominations from The American Billboards Video awards.

The album “In the Flow” was released in 1996 on the JVC/VERTEX label. Now with a permanent singer Lisa Taylor, the album yielded three singles: “Be Yourself” which charted in the top 40 in Japan; “If it’s all Good”and “Pearls.”

The third and final Colour Club record, “Sexuality,” was released in 1997 on JVC/Vertex and the single “Tenderness” was issued. The accompanying video was released and six weeks later JVC America closed its doors. The album never got a chance.

Discography

Music videos

References

External links
 Music Video: Freedom Words
 Music Video: If It's All Good
 Music Video: Pearls

Smooth jazz ensembles